John Frank Murphy (born 1977) is an American lawyer who is a United States district judge of the United States District Court for the Eastern District of Pennsylvania.

Education 
Murphy earned a Bachelor of Science in chemical engineering from Cornell University, summa cum laude, in 1999, a Master of Science and Doctor of Philosophy in chemical engineering from the California Institute of Technology in 2002 and 2004, and a Juris Doctor from Harvard Law School, cum laude, in 2007.

Career 
In 2008 and 2009, Murphy served as a law clerk for Judge Kimberly A. Moore of the United States Court of Appeals for the Federal Circuit. From 2007 to 2022, he was a partner with the Philadelphia office of BakerHostetler where he focused on intellectual property litigation.

In 2019, Murphy represented a number of plaintiffs suing to block the Pennsylvania Secretary of State's certification of ExpressVote XL electronic voting machines, challenging the security, reliability, and accuracy of the machines. 

Since 2014, he has worked as an adjunct professor of law at Rutgers Law School, where he teaches patent litigation.

Federal judicial service 

On July 12, 2022, President Joe Biden nominated Murphy to serve as a United States district judge of the United States District Court for the Eastern District of Pennsylvania.  Murphy had been recommended by Sentor Patrick Toomey and was nominated as part of a bipartisan package of nominees which included Kelley B. Hodge, Kai Scott, and Mia Roberts Perez. President Biden nominated Murphy to the seat vacated by Judge Lawrence F. Stengel, who retired on August 31, 2018. On September 7, 2022, a hearing on his nomination was held before the Senate Judiciary Committee. On September 28, 2022, his nomination was reported out of committee by a 18–4 vote. On December 7, 2022, his nomination was confirmed by a 63–28 vote. He received his judicial commission on December 23, 2022.

References

External links 

1977 births
Living people
21st-century American judges
21st-century American lawyers
California Institute of Technology alumni
Cornell University alumni
Harvard Law School alumni
Judges of the United States District Court for the Eastern District of Pennsylvania
Lawyers from Philadelphia
Pennsylvania lawyers
People associated with BakerHostetler
United States district court judges appointed by Joe Biden
Rutgers School of Law–Camden faculty